Zied Machmoum (Arabic: زياد مشموم; born 28 January 1993) is a Tunisian professional footballer who plays as a defender for Espérance de Tunis.

References

External links
 

1993 births
Living people
Association football defenders
Tunisian footballers
US Monastir (football) players
Espérance Sportive de Tunis players
Tunisian Ligue Professionnelle 1 players